Hamidi is a surname, derived from the Arabic male given name Hamid. Notable people with the surname include:

 Cheikh Hamidi (born 1983), Algerian footballer
 Elham Hamidi (born 1977), Iranian actress
 Javad Hamidi (1918–2002), Iranian painter
 Mohsen Hamidi (born 1985), Iranian footballer
 Youssef Al Hamidi (born 1977), Syrian boxer

See also

Arabic-language surnames
Iranian-language surnames
Patronymic surnames
Surnames from given names